was a city located in Aichi Prefecture, Japan. The city was founded on January 1, 1955.

On April 1, 2005, Bisai, along with the town of Kisogawa (from Haguri District), was merged into the expanded city of Ichinomiya.

As of 2003, the city had an estimated population of 58,037 and the density of 2,636.85 persons per km2. The total area was 22.01 km2.

External links 
  

Dissolved municipalities of Aichi Prefecture
2005 disestablishments in Japan
Ichinomiya, Aichi